The 2009–10 San Miguel Beermen season was the 35th season of the franchise in the Philippine Basketball Association (PBA).

Key dates 
 August 2: The 2009 PBA Draft took place in Fort Bonifacio, Taguig.

Draft picks

Roster

Philippine Cup

Eliminations

Standings

Game log

Eliminations 

|- bgcolor="#edbebf"
| 1
| October 14
| Barangay Ginebra
| 93–86
| Ildefonso (19)
| Peña (15)
| Racela (5)
| Araneta Coliseum
| 0–1
|- bgcolor="#edbebf"
| 2
| October 17
| Alaska
| 74–85
| Santos, Hontiveros (15)
| Peña (13)
| Custodio (5)
| Panabo, Davao del Norte
| 0–2
|- bgcolor="#bbffbb"
| 3
| October 21
| Burger King
| 117–99
| Santos (28)
| Santos (18)
| Racela (5)
| Cuneta Astrodome
| 1–2
|- bgcolor="#bbffbb"
| 4
| October 28
| Talk 'N Text
| 100–90
| Santos, Hontiveros (17)
| Peña (10)
| Custodio (7)
| Araneta Coliseum
| 2–2

|- bgcolor="#bbffbb"
| 5
| November 4
| Rain or Shine
| 93–77
| Tugade (16)
| Santos (9)
| Custodio (4)
| Araneta Coliseum
| 3–2
|- bgcolor="#bbffbb"
| 6
| November 7
| Sta. Lucia
| 88–69
| Santos (21)
| Peña (15)
| Cortez (4)
| Victorias City, Negros Occidental
| 4–2
|- bgcolor="#bbffbb"
| 7
| November 11
| Purefoods
| 92–76
| Cortez (22)
| Peña (11)
| Villanueva (7)
| Araneta Coliseum
| 5–2
|- bgcolor="#bbffbb"
| 8
| November 15
| Barako Bull
| 104–89
| Santos (33)
| Santos (8)
| Villanueva (11)
| Araneta Coliseum
| 6–2
|- bgcolor="#bbffbb"
| 9
| November 21
| Coca Cola
| 107–84
| Hontiveros (17)
| Eman (12)
| Villanueva (5)
| Cebu City
| 7–2
|- bgcolor="#edbebf"
| 10
| November 27
| Smart Gilas
| 96–109
| 
| 
| 
| Ynares Center
| 
|- bgcolor="#bbffbb"
| 11
| November 29
| Burger King
| 100–85
| Santos (27)
| Santos (12)
| Villanueva (7)
| Ynares Sports Arena
| 8–2

|- bgcolor="#bbffbb"
| 12
| December 4
| Sta. Lucia
| 110–94
| Hontiveros (21)
| Santos (11)
| Miranda (9)
| Araneta Coliseum
| 9–2
|- bgcolor="#edbebf"
| 13
| December 9
| Alaska
| 116–112 (OT)
| Santos (24)
| Santos (14)
| Villanueva (7)
| Araneta Coliseum
| 9–3
|- bgcolor="#bbffbb"
| 14
| December 13
| Purefoods
| 87–80
| Santos, Hontiveros (18)
| Peña (9)
| Villanueva (6)
| Araneta Coliseum
| 10–3
|- bgcolor="#bbffbb"
| 15
| December 18
| Rain or Shine
| 104–90
| Seigle (20)
| Santos (10)
| Cortez (8)
| Araneta Coliseum
| 11–3
|- bgcolor="#bbffbb"
| 16
| December 20
| Barangay Ginebra
| 91–86 (OT)
| Villanueva (17)
| Peña (12)
| Villanueva, Cortez (4)
| Araneta Coliseum
| 12–3

|- bgcolor="#bbffbb"
| 17
| January 8
| Barako Bull
| 94–85
| Santos (29)
| Santos (12)
| Villanueva (10)
| Cuneta Astrodome
| 13–3
|- bgcolor="#edbebf"
| 18
| January 13
| Coca Cola
| 107–118
| Santos (22)
| Santos (11)
| Cortez, Miranda (6)
| Araneta Coliseum
| 13–4
|- bgcolor="#edbebf"
| 19
| January 16
| Talk 'N Text
| 91–93
| Cortez (20)
| Washington (13)
| Hontiveros (5)
| Zamboanga City
| 13–5

Playoffs 

|- bgcolor="#bbffbb"
| 1
| February 10
| Purefoods
| 99–83
| Washington, Hontiveros (17)
| Washington (10)
| Villanueva (6)
| Araneta Coliseum
| 1–0
|- bgcolor="#edbebf"
| 2
| February 12
| Purefoods
| 84–103
| Seigle (16)
| Santos (12)
| Cortez, 2 others (3)
| Cuneta Astrodome
| 1–1
|- bgcolor="#bbffbb"
| 3
| February 14
| Purefoods
| 88–76
| Washington, Hontiveros (15)
| Santos (13)
| Cortez (9)
| Araneta Coliseum
| 2–1
|- bgcolor="#edbebf"
| 4
| February 17
| Purefoods
| 84–97
| Ildefonso (17)
| Santos (11)
| Villanueva (6)
| Araneta Coliseum
| 2–2
|- bgcolor="#edbebf"
| 5
| February 19
| Purefoods
| 82–94
| Washington (21)
| Peña (9)
| Villanueva (6)
| Araneta Coliseum
| 2–3
|- bgcolor="#edbebf"
| 6
| February 21
| Purefoods
| 78–87
| Santos (20)
| Santos (8)
| Villanueva (5)
| Cuneta Astrodome
| 2–4

|- bgcolor="#bbffbb"
| 1
| February 10
| Barangay Ginebra
| 95–88
| 
| 
| 
| Araneta Coliseum
|

Fiesta Conference

Eliminations

Standings

Game log

Transactions

Pre-season

Mid-season break

Fiesta Conference

Imports recruited

References 

San Miguel Beermen seasons
San Miguel